Golden River is a 1976 Soviet adventure film directed by Venyamin Dorman.

Plot 
The film takes place in 1923. The characters again find themselves in places where a large gold deposit was discovered, but getting it harder than before.

Cast 
 Boris Smorchkov as Aleksey Kumanin
 Aleksandr Abdulov as Boris Rogov
 Aleksandr Kaydanovskiy as Kirill Zimin
 Viktor Sergachyov as Yefim Subbota
 Yevgeniya Simonova as Tasya Smelkova
 Sergey Sazontev as Fedyakin
 Nikolay Olyalin as Silantiy
 Andrey Kharybin as Temka
 Vadim Zakharchenko as Khariton
 Nikolay Gorlov

References

External links 
 

1976 films
1970s Russian-language films
Soviet adventure films
1970s adventure films
Films set in 1923
Films set in Siberia